Tony James Lochhead (born 12 January 1982) is a New Zealand former professional footballer who appeared with the New Zealand national football team.

Early life and education 
Lochhead was born on 12 January 1982 in Tauranga, New Zealand. He was a student at Otumoetai College in Tauranga, where he played football and volleyball.

Lochhead went to the United States in 2001 to study at the University of California, Santa Barbara.  He was a student-athlete and played college soccer for the UC Santa Barbara Gauchos men's soccer team.  He was a member of the team from 2001 to 2004, starting all 83 games he played, and set a school record for total minutes.  Lochhead was named first-team All-Big West Conference in 2003, and was a second team All-American and the Big West Defensive Player of the Year in 2004.  As a senior, Lochhead lead UCSB to the finals of the 2004 NCAA Division I Men's Soccer Championship where the team fell in penalty kicks.

Club career 
Prior to attending UC Santa Barbara, Lochhead played with Tauranga City United AFC of the New Zealand National Soccer League.  While enrolled in college, he appeared in 10 games for USL Premier Development League team Orange County Blue Star and scored one goal.

Following his career at Santa Barbara, Lochhead was drafted 33rd overall in the 2005 MLS SuperDraft by the New England Revolution. However, at that time he elected not to sign with MLS to trial with European clubs.  While with R.S.C. Anderlecht, Lochhead injured his ankle and returned to Santa Barbara for rehab. A glandular fever slowed the recovery process, but Lochhead returned to Europe for trials in Sweden and Norway which also proved unsuccessful. He signed with New England in September 2005, some months into the season.  On 13 April 2007, the Revolution waived Lochhead to free up a senior roster spot for former UC Santa Barbara teammate Bryan Byrne who was signed the same day.

On 11 May 2007, Wellington Phoenix FC of Australia's A-League announced the signing of Lochhead on a two-year contract. In July 2008, news surfaced that Lochhead was on trial with English Premier League side Middlesbrough F.C. The next month, the Teesside Gazette reported that Lochhead had returned to Wellington Phoenix. On 25 November 2009 Lochhead made his 50th appearance for Wellington Phoenix in their 6–0 win over Gold Coast United FC and was the first Phoenix player to do so. On 9 June 2013, Lochhead was released after not being offered a new contract.

In January 2014 it was announced that newly appointed head coach, Wilmer Cabrera, had signed Lochhead to Major League Soccer side Chivas USA. The Chivas USA franchise folded at the conclusion of the 2014 season.

International career 
Lochhead represented New Zealand at Under 17 and under 23 level before making his full All Whites debut in a 0–3 loss Iran on 12 October 2003. He started every match for the team during 2006 FIFA World Cup Qualifying, and was included in the 2009 FIFA Confederations Cup squad.  Lochhead continues to play for the New Zealand national team and helped the Kiwis qualify for the 2010 World Cup Finals in South Africa.

On 10 May 2010, Lochhead was named in New Zealand's final 23-man squad to compete at the 2010 FIFA World Cup.

Personal life 
Lochhead married 2008 Miss Universe New Zealand contestant, Samantha Powell, in August 2012. Following his footballing career, Lochhead became involved with commercial real estate with Colliers International in Southern California.

Career statistics

Club

International

International goals

See also 
 List of foreign MLS players
 List of New Zealand international footballers
 List of University of California, Santa Barbara alumni
 List of Wellington Phoenix FC players

References

External links 

 
 Chivas USA player profile
 
 UC Santa Barbara player profile
 
 
 

1982 births
Living people
A-League Men players
Association football defenders
Chivas USA players
Expatriate soccer players in the United States
Major League Soccer players
New England Revolution draft picks
New England Revolution players
New Zealand association footballers
New Zealand expatriate sportspeople in the United States
New Zealand international footballers
Orange County Blue Star players
People educated at Otumoetai College
UC Santa Barbara Gauchos men's soccer players
USL League Two players
Sportspeople from Tauranga
Wellington Phoenix FC players
2004 OFC Nations Cup players
2008 OFC Nations Cup players
2009 FIFA Confederations Cup players
2010 FIFA World Cup players
2012 OFC Nations Cup players